

Walter Kuntze (23 February 1883  – 1 April 1960) was a German general and war criminal during World War II who commanded the 12th Army. He was the commanding officer responsible for the execution of men and teenage boys in the Kragujevac massacre, when Serbian civilians were murdered in reprisal for an attack on German troops, at the ratio of one hundred Serbs for every German soldier killed. Kuntze was assigned Deputy Wehrmacht Commander Southeast and Commander-in-Chief of the 12th Army on October 29. This was a temporary appointment, until Wilhelm List could return to duty. On October 31, Franz Böhme submitted a report to Kuntze in which he detailed the shootings in Serbia:

"Shooting: 405 hostages in Belgrade (total up to now in Belgrade, 4,750). 90 Communists in Camp Sebac. 2,300 hostages in Kragujevac. 1,700 hostages in Kraljevo."

Executions of Serbian civilians continued well into the following year. Kuntze stated the following in a directive of March 19, 1942:

"The more unequivocal and the harder reprisal measures are applied from the beginning the less it will become necessary to apply them at a later date. No false sentimentalities! It is preferable that 50 suspects are liquidated than one German soldier lose his life…If it is not possible to produce the people who have participated in any way in the insurrection or to seize them, reprisal measures of a general kind may be deemed advisable, for instance, the shooting to death of all male inhabitants from the nearest villages, according to a definite ratio (for instance, one German dead: 100 Serbs, one German wounded: 50 Serbs)."

Kuntze surrendered to the Allied troops in 1945 and was tried at the Hostages Trial in 1947. He was found guilty and sentenced to life imprisonment, but was released on medical parole in 1953. He died on 1 April 1960.

Awards and decorations

 Knight's Cross of the Iron Cross on 18 October 1941 as General der Pioniere and commander of XXXXII. Armeekorps

See also
 Hostages Trial
 List of Axis personnel indicted for war crimes

References

Citations

Bibliography

 
 

1883 births
1960 deaths
People from Rathenow
German Army generals of World War II
Generals of Engineers
German Army personnel of World War I
Recipients of the Knight's Cross of the Iron Cross
German people convicted of war crimes
German prisoners of war in World War II held by the United States
Yugoslavia in World War II
German people convicted of crimes against humanity
People convicted by the United States Nuremberg Military Tribunals
German prisoners sentenced to life imprisonment
Prisoners sentenced to life imprisonment by the United States military
People from the Province of Brandenburg
Recipients of the clasp to the Iron Cross, 1st class
German anti-communists
Major generals of the Reichswehr
German prisoners of war in World War II held by the United Kingdom
Military personnel from Brandenburg